The Lithuania women's national under-18 and under-19 basketball team is a national basketball team of Lithuania, administered by the Lithuanian Basketball Federation. It represents the country in women's international under-18 and under-19 basketball competitions.

FIBA U18 Women's European Championship participations

FIBA Under-19 Women's Basketball World Cup participations

See also
Lithuania women's national basketball team
Lithuania women's national under-17 basketball team
Lithuania men's national under-18 and under-19 basketball team

References

External links
Archived records of Lithuania team participations

Basketball in Lithuania
Basketball
Women's national under-19 basketball teams